Aristolaos (350? BC) was a Greek painter of high caliber who lived in Sicyon, and who was the son and pupil of the painter Pausias.

According to Pliny he was a very austere painter. He tried to improve the work of his father, The Sacrifice of Oxen. Works by Aristolaos include Theseus, Pericles, Epaminondas, Medea, and Attic Demos.

External links
Ancient Greek Pottery Painters

References

Ancient Greek painters
4th-century BC painters